Platonovka is the name of several rural localities in Russia.

Modern localities
Platonovka, Kursk Oblast, a khutor in Shevelevsky Selsoviet of Oboyansky District of Kursk Oblast
Platonovka, Novosibirsk Oblast, a village in Tatarsky District of Novosibirsk Oblast
Platonovka, Omsk Oblast, a village in Cherlaksky Rural Okrug of Novovarshavsky District of Omsk Oblast
Platonovka, Rostov Oblast, a khutor in Otradovskoye Rural Settlement of Azovsky District of Rostov Oblast
Platonovka, Samara Oblast, a selo in Shigonsky District of Samara Oblast
Platonovka, Tambov Oblast, a selo in Platonovsky Selsoviet of Rasskazovsky District of Tambov Oblast
Platonovka, Republic of Tatarstan, a village in Arsky District of the Republic of Tatarstan
Platonovka, Tula Oblast, a village in Kruglikovsky Rural Okrug of Yefremovsky District of Tula Oblast
Platonovka, Voronezh Oblast, a village in Tambovskoye Rural Settlement of Ternovsky District of Voronezh Oblast

Historical localities
Platonovka, Arkhangelsk Governorate, a colony included in Alexandrovskaya Volost of Alexandrovsky Uyezd of Arkhangelsk Governorate of the Russian SFSR upon its establishment in 1920